Cascade-Chipita Park is a census-designated place (CDP) comprising the unincorporated communities of Cascade and Chipita Park located in and governed by El Paso County, Colorado, United States. The CDP is a part of the Colorado Springs, CO Metropolitan Statistical Area. The population of the Cascade-Chipita Park CDP was 1,655 at the United States Census 2010. The Cascade post office (Zip Code 80809) serves the area.

Geography

Demographics

See also

Outline of Colorado
Index of Colorado-related articles
State of Colorado
Colorado cities and towns
Colorado census designated places
Colorado counties
El Paso County, Colorado
List of statistical areas in Colorado
Front Range Urban Corridor
South Central Colorado Urban Area
Colorado Springs, CO Metropolitan Statistical Area
Pikes Peak

References

External links

Cascade @ Colorado.com
Chipita Park @ Colorado.com
Cascade @ UncoverColorado.com
Chipita Park @ UncoverColorado.com
Chipita Park Association
El Paso County website

Census-designated places in El Paso County, Colorado
Census-designated places in Colorado